François Sérignat is a retired French para table tennis player who competed at international level events. He has participated at three Paralympic Games, he is a triple European champion and a double World bronze medalist. He has played alongside Gilles de la Bourdonnaye and Olivier Chateigner.

References

Living people
Year of birth missing (living people)
Paralympic table tennis players of France
Table tennis players at the 2000 Summer Paralympics
Table tennis players at the 2004 Summer Paralympics
Table tennis players at the 2008 Summer Paralympics
Medalists at the 2000 Summer Paralympics
Medalists at the 2004 Summer Paralympics
Medalists at the 2008 Summer Paralympics
French male table tennis players
21st-century French people
20th-century French people